The kèn is an instrument used in traditional Vietnamese music. It has a double reed and a conical wooden body. It produces a powerful and penetrating high-pitched sound, similar to the Chinese suona, the Korean taepyeongso, the Thai Pi, and the Persian/Indian shehnai. Its musical context resembles that of the oboes played by the Tai peoples, who call it the "Pí Lè", and the Muong people, who call it the "Bi". The name "Kèn" is also used to informally refer to Gourd mouth organs.

The best-known player of the kèn is the award-winning musician Nguyễn Ngọc Khánh (b. 1956), who is acknowledged as a "national treasure" in Vietnam, where he is known as "Khánh of the kèn."

Varieties
Kèn bầu - with a wooden bell carved in a gourd shape; comes in several sizes
Kèn đám ma - with a metal bell; used for funerals in northern Vietnam

References

External links
 lotusandlightning.com (A page with streaming audio samples of Nguyễn Ngọc Khánh playing the kèn)

Double-reed instruments
Vietnamese musical instruments